Bartolomeo Trevisan (died 1509) was a Roman Catholic prelate who served as Bishop of Belluno (1499–1509).

On 26 August 1499, Bartolomeo Trevisan was appointed during the papacy of Pope Alexander VI as Bishop of Belluno.
He served as Bishop of Belluno until his death on 4 Sep 1509.

References

External links and additional sources
 (for Chronology of Bishops) 
 (for Chronology of Bishops)  

15th-century Italian Roman Catholic bishops
16th-century Italian Roman Catholic bishops
Bishops appointed by Pope Alexander VI
1509 deaths